The Fairmount Park neighborhood of West Seattle in Seattle, Washington, runs along both sides of Fauntleroy Way SW from SW Graham Street in the south to SW Edmunds Street in the north. Neighborhood features include Fairmount Playfield—a city park—and Fairmount Park Elementary School, part of the Seattle Public Schools system.

References

External links
Seattle City Clerk's Neighborhood Map Atlas — Fairmount Park

West Seattle, Seattle